Thurber can refer to:

People:
James Thurber (1894–1961), American humorist and cartoonist
Alexandre Thurber (1871–1958), Quebec industrialist and politician
Charles Thurber, black man lynched in 1882
Charles Thurber (1803–1886), American inventor who contributed to the early typewriter
George Thurber (1821-1890), American naturalist and writer
James A. Thurber (born 1943), political science professor
Jeannette Thurber (1850–1946), patron of classical music in the United States
Marion Bartlett Thurber ((1885 - 1973), American political spouse
Rawson Marshall Thurber (born 1975), American filmmaker
Tom Thurber (1934–2010), Canadian politician
Frances Thurber Seal (ca. 1860 – 1930s), Christian Science teacher from the U.S.

Other uses:
Thurber, Texas, a ghost town
Thurber House, a literary center named after James Thurber

See also
Torbjörn, for an etymology of the name
Thorburn
Thoburn
Thulborn
Turbin